The Groote Kerk (Afrikaans and Dutch for "Great Church") is a Dutch Reformed church in Graaff-Reinet, South Africa.

External links 
 Church congregation website. 
 Tourism website of the city of Graaff-Reinet.

Churches in the Eastern Cape